Mi Ta-Lat was a principal queen consort of King Binnya Dhammaraza of Hanthawaddy Pegu. Daughter of Governor General Smin Awa Naing, Ta-Lat was married to Prince Dhammaraza by 1415.

Notes

References

Bibliography
 
 

Queens consort of Hanthawaddy